The National State TV and Radio Company of the Republic of Belarus, known as Belteleradiocompany or simply Belteleradio, is the state television and radio broadcasting service in Belarus.

From 1993 until 2021, it was a full active member of the European Broadcasting Union (EBU) under the name Belarusian Television and Radio Company (BTRC). In May 2021, the EBU Executive Board agreed to suspend BTRC as a member of the broadcasting union effective 11 June 2021. The broadcaster later revealed that the suspension would expire in 2024. 

Belteleradiocompany gives particular importance to the development of international cooperation and is partnered with broadcasting companies all over the world. The company has concluded a total of 63 cooperation agreements with foreign broadcasters.

History 

The first service of Belarusian radio went on air on November 15, 1925 at the RV-10 radio stationnamed after the Council of People's Commissars of the BSSR. The programs were broadcast for 30 minutes a day within a radius of up to 300 km. Since 1926, broadcasts of radio newscasts for workers and peasants started, followed by broadcasts from theaters and clubs and music programs. Since 1928, wire broadcasting has been developing, a weekly broadcasting schedule has been formed, taking into account the professional and age characteristics of the target audience. In the 1930s, regional and district broadcasting developed.

Radio Committee of the BSSR (1933–1953)
In 1933, the Committee for Radio Information and Radio Broadcasting of the Council of People's Commissars of the BSSR (Radio Committee of the BSSR) was created. Improvement of technical means (construction of a powerful radio station in Kolodischi, etc.) made it possible to broadcast live. In 1936, sound recording devices were used for the first time on Belarusian radio. In 1938, broadcasting began in the new Radio House, where there were three new studios and a mechanical broadcasting and sound recording workshop. During the Great Patriotic War, the radio station RV-10 named after the Council of People's Commissars of the BSSR temporarily ceased its activity. On January 1, 1942, the radio station "Soviet Belarus" began operating on short waves in Moscow. Through the transmitter of the Radio Station. The BSSR Council of People's Commissars, the German occupation administration launched the Landessender Minsk radio station. The radio station RV-10 named after the Council of People's Commissars of the BSSR went on the air again in 1944, first in the liberated Gomel, then in Minsk.

Radio control of the BSSR (1953–1957)

In 1953, the Radio Committee of the BSSR was reorganized into the Main Directorate of Radio Information of the Ministry of Culture of the BSSR (Radio Administration of the BSSR). In the 1950s. Intensive work has begun to improve the quality of radio broadcasting. New equipment was installed in the House of Radio, which made it possible to improve the quality of recorded broadcasts. On January 1, 1956, the Radio Control of the BSSR launched its television service – "Belarusian Television" (BT). With the commissioning of the Minsk Television Center in 1955, a 2-program VHF radio broadcasting station was put into operation. The average daily volume of one-channel broadcasting was estimated at the time to be 2–3 hours, and the audience of the TV channel was 4.5 thousand viewers. The TV schedule was consisted mostly of feature films, chronicles, concerts and performances, materials filmed (sent from Moscow and local distribution). Information programs were illustrated with film and photographic materials. In the late 1950s, live broadcasts were organized (1957), and its own production of documentaries and television plays began.

Gosteleradio BSSR (1957–1991)
In 1957, the Radio Control of the BSSR was reorganized into the State Committee of the BSSR on Television and Radio Broadcasting (Gosteleradio BSSR). In the 1960s, 70% of the territory of Belarus was provided with television. A two-program TV was formed (based on the programs of the 1st program of the Moscow Central Television). In the 1960s, complete radio coverage of Belarus was completed, new radio stations appeared: "Belarus" (05.1962), which provided regular broadcasting to foreign countries, "Belarusian Youth" (02.1963), "Rural Life" (04.1964). The department of theory and practice of radio broadcasting and television was opened at the Faculty of Journalism of the Belarusian State University with the aim of training qualified personnel. The volume of its own broadcasting was 718 hours a year, 50% of which was occupied by social and political programs. In the mid-1960s, its own production of feature and documentary television films began (on the basis of the main editorial office of Telefilm). In 1962, with the starting of Intervision, an exchange of programs with other republics began. In 1961, the Minsk Television Studio and the Committee for Radio and Television were merged into one creative team, in March 1964 it was renamed into the Studio of the Belarusian Television.

In the 1970s, 22 radio broadcasting stations operated on the territory of Belarus. During this period, the transition to 3-program wire broadcasting was carried out, stereo broadcasting was formed on ultrashort waves. In 1972 the State Television and Radio Broadcasting of the BSSR launched the Krynitsa radio station on medium waves. By the beginning of the 80s, there were 6 regional bureaux, 115 district, 12 city and 32 factory radios. In the 1970s and 1980s, television broadcasting covered already 95% of the territory of Belarus. Since 1972, the programs have been broadcast on 3 programs, including color programs of its own production (since 1974). In 1978, the hardware-studio complex of the Belarusian Radio Television Center was put into operation, which made it possible to increase the volume and quality of the color image. In January 1981, Channel 6 aired an independent Belarusian program, which was not covered by programs from Moscow. In terms of the volume of its own production, it occupied the 6th place in the USSR, and its programs were watched by 86% of the inhabitants of Belarus. The broadcasting structure of the national TV channel consisted of 3 blocks: information and journalistic, scientific and educational and artistic.

State TV and Radio of the Republic of Belarus (1991–1994)
In September 1991, the State Television and Radio Broadcasting of the BSSR was renamed into the State Committee of the Republic of Belarus on Television and Radio Broadcasting (State Television and Radio of the Republic of Belarus). In the early 1990s, the unified system of state television in Belarus included 6 television centers, 50 transmitters, and more than 2000 radio relay communication lines. This made it possible to repurpose the program to a more powerful 1st communication channel. The average daily volume of republican and regional broadcasting was 14.5 hours. Since January 1993, the State Television and Radio Broadcasting of the Republic of Belarus has become a full member of the European Broadcasting Union (EBU). In the 1990s, a new stage began in the development of Belarusian radio broadcasting: reforming the structure of the Belarusian radio, improving its program, ideological and creative components.

Belteleradiocompany (since 1994)

In August 1994, by the Decree of the President of the Republic of Belarus, on the basis of the State Committee on Television and Radio Broadcasting, the National State Television and Radio Company of the Republic of Belarus was established. In May of the same year, the radio broadcasting programs "Krinitsa" and "Belorusskaya Molodezhnaya" were combined into the program "Radio 2"  (since 2002, "Kultura"), which began to be retransmitted on the second wire broadcasting channel. In 1995, the Television News Agency (ATN) was established to improve the process of informing the population. New information technologies and broadcasting models began to be used (direct lines, television debates, talk shows, etc.), national television series appeared ("The Cursed Cozy House", 1999). In 1998, the NGTRK of the Republic of Belarus launched the Stolitsa radio station, which began to be retransmitted on the third wire broadcasting channel. Since June 15, 1998 there has been a radio program "Belarus" broadcasting also in Russian and Ukrainian. In the 2000s, a number of TV channels were created in the Belteleradiocompany system: LAD (2003), Belarus-TV (2005). The introduction of test digital transmitters in 2004 made it possible to record broadcasts more efficiently and with high quality.

Since 2005, all channels and radio stations of the Belarusian Radio were now being streamed live on the Internet. From December 22, 2005 to December 28, 2010 Alexander Zimovsky was the chairman of the Belteleradiocompany.

From October 1, 2009 to December 31, 2012 (according to Presidential Decree No. 523, signed on October 23, 2009) the NGTRK and the organizations included in its system are exempt from paying taxes on profit and value added (except for value added tax levied upon import of goods into the customs territory of Belarus, unless otherwise provided by legislative acts).

In November 2011, the channels were rebranded: on November 5, Channel One changed its name to "Belarus 1", on November 14 LAD became known as "Belarus 2", and the international "Belarus TV" on January 1, 2013 was renamed "Belarus 24". On February 8, 2013, the digital socio-cultural TV channel "Belarus 3" was launched. On April 1, 2016, the broadcasting of versions of the First National Channel of the Belarusian Radio on long and medium waves stopped.

On August 17, 2020, protests and strikes were held against the results of the 2020 presidential elections in Belarus. State television also went on strike, Belarus 1 showed first an empty studio, and then reruns of old programs.

On May 28, 2021, according to the results of post-election monitoring, the European Broadcasting Union suspended the membership of the BTRK in the Broadcasting Union. The indignation of the union was caused, among other things, by the broadcast on the air of "Belarus 1" of the "repentance" of political prisoners (in particular, Roman Protasevich and Sofia Sapieha), made under obvious pressure.

Services

Television
Belteleradio operates six television channels, of which five are distributed nationally and one is distributed internationally.   

Belarus 1 – News, current affairs, and general interest programming
 – Entertainment and sports programming
 – Cultural programming, mostly broadcasts in Belarusian language
 – Regional news, entertainment and cultural programming. Broadcasts separately for Brest, Vitebsk, Gomel, Grodno, Minsk and Mogilev regions
 – Sports channel
Belarus 24 – International channel catering to viewers outside of Belarus
 – Belarusian version of NTV Russia; programming consists of content from NTV Russia and other Russian channels

Radio
Belteleradio operates two national radio services and three regional FM services. 

 – The largest nationwide radio channel in Belarus
Radio Belarus – National and international service with programming in seven languages (Belarusian, English, French, German, Polish, Russian, and Spanish) 
 – Regional FM service, cultural and musical programming.
 – Regional FM service, local programming.
Radius-FM – Regional FM service, youth-oriented music station.

Censorship and propaganda

International experts and the Belarusian opposition name the state TV as one of the main instruments of propaganda by the authoritarian regime of Alexander Lukashenko. It is being accused of misinformation, advocating political repressions and rigging of elections, smearing regime critics.

Employees and top managers of state TV channels, including channels of BTRC, have several times been subjects to sanctions from the EU and the United States.

References

External links 

  
  
  

Eastern Bloc mass media
Multilingual broadcasters
Communications in Belarus
Television in Belarus
Censorship in Belarus
Propaganda in Belarus
European Broadcasting Union members
1956 establishments in Belarus
Television channels and stations established in 1956
State media